The Salvadoran Civil War was a military conflict that pitted the guerrilla forces of the left-wing Marxist-oriented Farabundo Marti National Liberation Front (FMLN) against the armed and security forces loyal to the military-led conservative government of El Salvador, between 1979 and 1992. Main combatants comprised:

 The Armed Forces of El Salvador ( – FAES), which were backed by the United States, Taiwan and Israel, were the official armed defense forces of El Salvador. Subordinated to the Ministry of Defense and Security of the  Salvadoran government at the capital San Salvador, the FAES branches were organized as follows:
Salvadoran Army (Spanish: Ejército Salvadoreño) 
Salvadoran Air Force (Spanish: Fuerza Aérea Salvadoreña)
Salvadoran Navy (Spanish: Fuerza Naval de El Salvador) 
Paramilitary security forces:
National Guard of El Salvador (Spanish: Guardia Nacional de El Salvador)

 The Farabundo Marti National Liberation Front, more commonly known by its Spanish acronym FMLN, was an alliance or umbrella organization of five left-wing guerrilla groups created in 1980, which was backed by Cuba, Nicaragua, and the Eastern Bloc countries. 

An eclectic variety of weapons was used by both sides in the Salvadoran Civil War. The Salvadoran FAES were equipped with Western-made weapons, mainly American and Israeli in origin, but also included Argentine, Portuguese, French, West German, Yugoslavian and Taiwanese military hardware. During the early phase of the war, the FMLN likewise were largely equipped with Western arms and munitions, though as the war went on, Eastern Bloc weaponry began to play a major role.

Weapons of the Salvadoran FAES

Small arms

Pistols

 FN35 9mm
 M1911

Battle and assault rifles

 Heckler & Koch G3: Originally the standard service rifle of the Salvadoran Army before being replaced by the M-16A1/A2. The first G3s were of West German origin; however, when the U.S. began increasing small arms deliveries to El Salvador, they purchased surplus rifles from Portugal and gave them as military aid.
 M16A1/A2: The M16A1/A2 was initially issued to elite units before being issued to the rest of the army when it became the standard rifle. The first large-scale delivery occurred in 1981 with 11,868 units delivered. A total of 32,374 M16A1/A2 rifles were delivered between 1980 and 1993. The U.S. began to replace the G3 rifles in the hands of the Salvadorian Army in 1981 with the delivery of 11,868 AR-15A1 R613 (M16A1); followed by another 20,743 M16s purchased with FMS funds for El Salvador in 1982.  Many of these "new" rifles were actually leftovers from Vietnam.  Eventually, another 45,160 AR-15A1 R613 followed, to include more than 500 CAR-15A1 R639 (XM177E2 Commando – typified as M16A2 for El Salvador) to equip the Mechanized Infantry and officer Corps and hundreds of CAR-15A1 R653 (M16A1) Carbines starting in 1985, and even brand-new M16s supplied by Springfield Armory.
 CAR-15: Colt Automatic Rifle-15 Military Weapons System or CAR-15. The CAR-15: Colt Automatic Rifle-15 Military Weapons System or CAR-15 was delivered to all military branches of the Armed Forces of El Salvador and was also used with attached M203 grenade launchers.
 Colt Commando (model 733, note M16A2-style brass deflector and forward assist), the USA military aid to El Salvador included the supply of this Car-15 variant that was used extensively by the Armed Forces of El Salvador. They also were used with attached M203 grenade launchers. The BIRI (immediate reaction infantry battalion) used this variant with the M203 attached.
 IMI Galil 
 Heckler & Koch HK33
 T65 assault rifle: Taiwan had extensive diplomatic and military ties with El Salvador. Before and during the civil war, the Republic of China (Taiwan) sold weaponry including the T65 to the former Salvadoran security forces. Taiwan also trained Salvadoran military officers in the civil war; even after the end of the war, Taiwan had continued to give military advice and training to its diplomatic allies including El Salvador until 2018.

Carbines and semi-automatic rifles
 M1/M2 carbine
 M1 Garand
 M14 rifle

Sniper rifles

 Steyr SSG 69
 M1D Sniper rifle: 184 units delivered (1980-1993).
 M21 Sniper Weapon System
 M24 Sniper Weapon System

Submachine guns
 Uzi
 FMK M35 High Power
 FMK-PA-3 9mm
 Heckler & Koch MP5

Machine guns

 Madsen M1934/M1951
 Heckler & Koch HK21
 FN Minimi
 FN MAG
 M60
 M60E2
 M60D
 Browning M1919A4 .30 Cal 
 Browning M2HB .50 Cal

Grenade systems
 Mark 2 Fragmentation Hand/Rifle Grenade
 M61 Fragmentation Hand Grenade 
 M67 hand grenade
 M18 Smoke Hand Grenade
 M26A1 Fragmentation Hand Grenade
 M34 White Phosphorus Smoke Grenade

Land mine systems
M18A1 Claymore anti-personnel mine 
M14 anti-personnel mine 
M26 anti-personnel mine

Anti-tank rocket and grenade launchers

 M72 LAW
 M79 grenade launcher: 1,704 units delivered (1980–1993)
 M203 grenade launcher: 1,413 units delivered (1980–1993)

Mortars
M19 60mm  
M29 81mm
M74 120mm 
UB M-52 120mm

Recoilless rifles
M20 75mm
M67 90mm
M40A1 106mm

Artillery
M101A1 105mm towed field howitzer 
M102 105mm light towed field howitzer
M56 105mm towed field howitzer: Yugoslav version of the M101 howitzer.
M114 155mm howitzer

Anti-aircraft weapons

 TCM-20 20mm mount
 Zastava M55 A2 20mm
 FIM-43 Redeye surface-to-air missile

Vehicles
Panhard AML-90 armoured car
Thyssen Henschel UR-416 armoured car
VAL M-37B1 Cashuat armoured personnel carrier
Ford F-250 Astroboy armoured personnel carrier
M3 Scout Car
M3A1 Half-track
Jeep CJ-5
M151 ¼-ton 4×4 utility truck
M35A2 2½-ton 6x6 medium cargo truck
M809 5-ton 6x6 heavy cargo truck
MAN 630 heavy cargo truck

Helicopters
Aérospatiale SA 315B Lama II light helicopter
Aérospatiale SA 316B/C Alouette III light utility helicopter
Fairchild Hiller FH-1100 light helicopter
MD 500D Defender light multi-role military helicopter (used in the gunship role)
Bell UH-1H/M Iroquois (used in the transport and gunship roles)
Bell 412 Multipurpose Utility helicopter

Aircraft

Fouga CM.170 Magister Jet trainer/light strike aircraft.
Dassault MD 450B Ouragan Fighter-bomber
Cessna A-37B Dragonfly ground-attack aircraft
Douglas AC-47 Spooky Gunship
Douglas C-47D Skytrain Military transport aircraft
Fairchild C-123K Provider Military transport aircraft
Douglas DC-6B Airliner/transport aircraft
IAI Arava 201 STOL utility transport
Cessna 0-2A/B Super Skymaster Observation aircraft 
Cessna 337A Super Skymaster Utility aircraft
Cessna 180 Skywagon light utility aircraft
Cessna T-41 Mescalero trainer
Beechcraft T-34 Mentor trainer

Naval craft
 CG 40ft-type patrol launch
 Camcraft-type small patrol boat
 US Protector-class patrol boat
 US 65ft Commercial Cruiser-class patrol boat
 US Swiftships 65ft class patrol boat
 US Swiftships 77ft class patrol boat
 US Point-class cutter/patrol boat
 US Balsam-class navigation aids tender (served as flagship for the Salvadoran Navy and offshore patrol vessel)
 LCM-6 Landing Craft Utility (LCU)
 LCM-8 Landing Craft Utility (LCU)

Weapons of the FMLN

Small arms

Pistols

 Pa-63
 Tokarev TT-33: Included the North Korean Type 68 variant.
 Makarov PM
 M1911: Captured
 CZ 52

Battle and assault rifles

 FN FAL: Most of the FAL rifles used by the guerrillas were traced by their serial numbers to rifles previously sold by Belgium to Cuba during the late Batista and early Castro years. 
 Heckler & Koch G3: Captured
 M16A1: The bulk of the M16A1 rifles captured by government forces from the guerrillas were also traced from their serial numbers to shipments sent by the United States to the South Vietnamese Army of the Republic of Vietnam (ARVN) prior to the fall of the Saigon government in 1975.
 AK-47 (Included both the Soviet model and the North Korean Type 58)
 AKM (Variants also used included the Hungarian AK-63, East German MpiKMS-72, Romanian Pistol Mitralieră model 1963/1965 and the North Korean Type 68)
 Type 56 from China
 T65 assault rifle: Captured
 Heckler & Koch HK33: Captured
 IMI Galil: Captured
 CAR-15: Captured

Carbines and semi-automatic rifles

 SKS
 Type 63 rifle

Sniper rifles

 Dragunov SVD-63 sniper rifle

Submachine guns
 Sa 23 and 25
 Halcón ML-60
 M3A1 "Grease gun"
 Carl Gustaf m/45: Egyptian-produced version, dubbed the "Port Said".
 Steyr MPi 69
 Star Model Z62
 Uzi

Machine guns

 RPK: Versions used included the Yugoslav and Romanian types.
 RPD
 PKM
 Heckler & Koch HK21: Captured
 M60: Captured
 FN MAG: Captured
 M2HB: Captured

Grenade systems
 F1 
 RG-42
 RGD-5
 RKG-3

Land mine systems
"Fan mine" (Spanish: mina abanico): home-made anti-personnel mine, similar in design to the M18 Claymore. 
"Clothespin mine" (Spanish: mina de chuchitos): home-made anti-personnel mine. 
"Foot remover mine" (Spanish: mina de pateos or quita pata): home-made anti-personnel mine.

Anti-tank rocket and grenade launchers

 RPG-2: Mainly the Chinese Type 56 version
 RPG-7
 RPG-18
 M26 grenade launcher

Recoilless rifles
M67 recoilless rifle: Captured 
SPG-9 73mm

Anti-aircraft weapons

 SA-7 Grail surface-to-air missile
 SA-14 Gremlin surface-to-air missile
 FIM-43 Redeye surface-to-air missile

See also
Salvadoran Civil War
National Guard (Nicaragua)
Nicaraguan Revolution

Notes

References

 Carlos Caballero Jurado & Nigel Thomas, Central American Wars 1959–89, Men-at-Arms series 221, Osprey Publishing Ltd, London 1990. 
 David Spencer, Armoured Fighting Vehicles of El Salvador, Museum Ordnance Special Number 7 – English Edition, Darlington Productions, Inc., Mass Market Paperback, 1995. 
 Daniel Moran, Wars of National Liberation, Smithsonian History of Warfare series, Harper Paperbacks, 2006. 
 Jane Haapiseva-Hunter, Israeli foreign policy: South Africa and Central America, South End Press, 1999. 
 John Pimlott (ed.), Guerrilla Warfare, Bison Books Ltd., London 1985. 
 Julio Montes, Mexican and Central American Armor, Darlington Productions, Inc., 2001. 
Physicians for Human Rights (U.S.), Landmines: A Deadly Legacy, The Arms Project, Human Rights Watch, New York – Washington – Los Angeles – London 1993.

Secondary sources

Bill Gunston, An Illustrated Guide to Military Helicopters, Salamander Books Ltd, London 1981. 
Bob Cashner, The FN FAL Battle Rifle, Weapon series 27, Osprey Publishing Ltd, Oxford 2013. 
Christopher F. Foss, Jane's Tank & Combat Vehicle recognition guide, HarperCollins Publishers, London 2002. 
Gordon L. Rottman, The Rocket-propelled Grenade, Weapon series 2, Osprey Publishing Ltd, Oxford 2010. 
Gordon L. Rottman, The AK-47 Kalashnikov-series assault rifles, Weapon series 8, Osprey Publishing Ltd, Oxford 2011. 
Gordon L. Rottman, US Grenade Launchers – M79, M203, and M320, Weapon series 57, Osprey Publishing Ltd, Oxford 2017. 
Kevin Dockery, The M60 machine gun, Weapon series 20, Osprey Publishing Ltd, Oxford 2012. 
Leroy Thompson, The G3 Battle Rifle, Weapon series 68, Osprey Publishing Ltd, Oxford 2019. 
Joseph E. Smith (ed.) & W. H. B. Smith, Small Arms of the World: a basic manual of Small Arms, Stackpole Books, Harrisburg, Pennsylvania 1969 (9th Revised edition). 
Tony Eastwood & John Roach, Piston Engine Airliner Production List, The Aviation Hobby Shop, 1991. 
Michael Taylor, Encyclopedia of Modern Military Aircraft, Gallery Books, 1987. 
Paul F. Hatch, "World Air Forces 1988", Flight International, 3 December 1988, volume 134, issue 4142, pp. 22–87.

External links
 El Salvador - Appendix A. Tables (military equipment) country-data.com
 El Salvador: Standing Tall
 Weapons of the FMLN by Lawrence J. Whelan
 Weapons of the FMLN-Part Two: The Logistics of an Insurgency By Lawrence J. Whelan

Salvadoran Civil War
Salvadoran Civil War